Bugaj may refer to the following places:
Bugaj, Gorlice County in Lesser Poland Voivodeship (south Poland)
Bugaj, Pajęczno County in Łódź Voivodeship (central Poland)
Bugaj, Radomsko County in Łódź Voivodeship (central Poland)
Bugaj, Wadowice County in Lesser Poland Voivodeship (south Poland)
Bugaj, Busko County in Świętokrzyskie Voivodeship (south-central Poland)
Bugaj, Jędrzejów County in Świętokrzyskie Voivodeship (south-central Poland)
Bugaj, Kielce County in Świętokrzyskie Voivodeship (south-central Poland)
Bugaj, Pińczów County in Świętokrzyskie Voivodeship (south-central Poland)
Bugaj, Sandomierz County in Świętokrzyskie Voivodeship (south-central Poland)
Bugaj, Skarżysko County in Świętokrzyskie Voivodeship (south-central Poland)
Bugaj, Chodzież County in Greater Poland Voivodeship (west-central Poland)
Bugaj, Koło County in Greater Poland Voivodeship (west-central Poland)
Bugaj, Kalisz County in Greater Poland Voivodeship (west-central Poland)
Bugaj, Ostrów Wielkopolski County in Greater Poland Voivodeship (west-central Poland)
Bugaj, Gmina Kleszczewo in Greater Poland Voivodeship (west-central Poland)
Bugaj, Gmina Pobiedziska in Greater Poland Voivodeship (west-central Poland)
Bugaj, Szamotuły County in Greater Poland Voivodeship (west-central Poland)
Bugaj, Września County in Greater Poland Voivodeship (west-central Poland)
Bugaj, Opole Voivodeship (south-west Poland)

See also